Acne aestivalis also called as acne mallorca, is a special kind of polymorphous light eruption induced by ultra violet A radiation. This condition is said to be seasonal, usually affecting people in springtime and goes away in autumn when there is less sun light. This photo induced skin reaction leads to a mono-morphous eruption that consists of multiple, uniform, red, papular lesions. This skin reaction is classified as a delayed-type hypersensitivity because the onset is 24–72 hours after sun exposure. The condition equally affects men and women between the ages of 20–40 years old with no prior history of acne vulgaris. The eruption is unusual because it spares the face but it affects the lateral aspects of the upper arms, shoulder girdle, back, and chest. This condition's pathogenesis is not very well understood but scientists believe it an unfortunate side effect that results from a strong immune response to potentially cancer-causing cell damage.

Signs and Symptoms 
 
Patients present numerous lesions of small papules that are dull red, dome shaped, hard, and usually not more than 2–4 mm in diameter. These lesions do not affect the face but affect lateral aspects of upper arms, shoulder girdle, back, and chest. The papules have an onset of 1–3 days after sun exposure and may last for many weeks. Comedones are not present in this type of skin reaction.

Cause 
 
The main cause of this condition is sun exposure. Hypersensitivity to the sun may be experienced due to genetic predisposition. It is also speculated that cosmetics and sun care products containing hydroxyl peroxides may trigger this condition through free radical and ultra violet A radiation photo-toxic reactions.

Mechanism/pathophysiology 
The actual mechanism of disease is not very well understood but there are a few speculations. It is believed that acne aestivalis has a genetic predisposition involved in which people who show acne aestivalis have lower expression of apoptosis inducing genes which leads to inflammation. Inflammation is believed to be triggered by circulating ultra violet radiation damaged cells that could not go through apoptosis and the cell fragments they release. Also, it is speculated that this sun induced acne form is caused by a photo allergic reaction between sunscreen, skin, and the sun. A photo-toxic reaction pathogenesis is also possible through free radical release in sun screen oxidation by ultra violet radiation.

Diagnosis 
The diagnosis is by visual examination of skin lesions and sun exposure history. A diagnosis of acne aestivalis is made once the patient reports the onset of papules was 1–3 days after sun exposure.

Treatment 
The treatment for this condition is topical tretinoin or benzoyl peroxide applied to the skin. The use of topical steroids should be avoided. Currently, there is no systemic treatment for acne aestivalis.

Prognosis
This condition is alleviated during the fall season when there is less sun light available. The papules do not leave a scar on the affected person's skin.

Epidemiology 
There is limited information on the epidemiology of this condition. This disease was first noticed in Scandinavian men and women between the ages of 20 and 40 years old. The skin eruption would present in this population after sunbathing in Mallorca beach after a long and dark winter season.

Research 

In 2001, a study was conducted to test a prophylaxis regimen containing alpha-glucosylrutin, a strong plant-derived antioxidant. The focus of the experiment was to evaluate the effects of alpha-glucosylrutin on polymorphous light eruption and acne aestivalis development. The study demonstrated that applying alpha-glucosylrutin along with SPF 15 sunscreen decreases severe polymorphous light eruption cases from 96.2% to 7.4%.The study included 20 people with polymorphous light eruption and 3 people with acne aestivalis. In this study, 2 out of the 3 people with acne aestivalis did not have an episode of lesions after being prophylactically treated with alpha-glucosylrutin and SPF 15.

References

External links

Acneiform eruptions